Saxifraga globulifera is a flowering plant of the genus Saxifraga and the family Saxifragaceae.

Habitat

The plant grows in southern Spain on limestone rocks and cliffs. 
The Gibraltar Saxifrage, a variety, is an endemic plant in the Upper Rock Nature Reserve in Gibraltar.
An 1838 survey of plants in the region said that the plants found in Spain did not differ in any respect from plants found in the Atlas mountains across the strait of Gibraltar.
Sir William Jackson Hooker wrote of the plants he found in 1844 on the Sierra de Mijas, to the north of the road from Málaga to Gibraltar. He found Saxifraga globulifera in the clefts of rock on the south side of the mountain, as well as other plants that grow on Mount Atlas.

Description

In 1827 the plant was described as follows:

They have semi-circular outlines with three or more lobes. 

See also
 List of plants in the Gibraltar Botanic Gardens

References

Citations

Sources

Flora of Gibraltar
globulifera